The Central Institute of Higher Tibetan Studies (CIHTS), formerly called Central University for Tibetan Studies (CUTS), is a Deemed University founded in Sarnath, Varanasi, India, in 1967, as an autonomous organisation under Union Ministry of Culture. 
The CIHTS was founded by Pt. Jawahar Lal Nehru in consultation with Tenzin Gyatso, the 14th Dalai Lama, with the aim of educating Tibetan youths in exile and Himalayan border students as well as with the aim of retranslating lost Indo-Buddhist Sanskrit texts that now existed only in Tibetan, into Sanskrit, to Hindi, and other modern Indian languages .

Background

Invasion of Tibet
Once Kuomintang forces were defeated or expelled to Taiwan, the People’s Liberation Army (PLA) turned its attention on Chinese territories in the hinterlands, particularly Tibet.  Prior to the PRC’s establishment, the historical borderland between culturally Chinese and Tibetans, known as Kham, fell partly under the jurisdiction of Sikang Province under the Republic of China, but its western half, known as Chamdo, was occupied and controlled by Tibetan authorities from Lhasa.  After months of failed negotiations, the PLA invaded the de facto Tibetan state in Chamdo, and the region fell to Chinese occupation in just a few weeks.  Subsequent negotiations resulted in the official annexation of Tibet by the People’s Republic of China.  Tibet agreed to the new Seventeen Point Agreement because it allowed for the continuation of an autonomous administration led by Tibet’s spiritual and then-political leader, the 14th Dalai Lama.  The PLA campaign was a tremendous success in capturing the Tibetan army occupying Chamdo, demoralizing the government in Lhasa, and exerting pressure to force Tibetan representatives to agree to negotiations in Beijing which would ultimately lead to terms recognizing China’s sovereignty over Tibet.

Sino-Indian Border Conflict
Relations between India and Communist China quickly deteriorated in the 1950s as the PRC rushed to secure a southern border which would provide adequate security in the Himalayan frontier.  The border dispute between the two countries was further fueled by the situation in Tibet.  In 1959, an uprising broke out in Lhasa because Tibetan protestors feared China might arrest the Dalai Lama.  The initially peaceful protest was brutally ended by the PLA, and the Dalai Lama fled to India, established the Central Tibetan Administration, and rescinded its acceptance of the Seventeen Point Agreement.  India granting the Dalai Lama asylum led to border skirmishes with China, and all diplomatic settlements proposed by the PRC were rejected by India until in 1962, abandoning attempts for peaceful resolution, China invaded disputed territory.  The Sino-Indian War ended 1 month later when China declared a ceasefire and withdrew to its “Line of Actual Control.”  Clashes between Indian and PLA forces erupt again in 1967, suggesting Sino-Indian relations had not improved in the immediate years following the war.

Tibetology
The uprising in 1959 sparked a wave of mass emigration to India by tens-of-thousands of Tibetans who feared persecution by the People’s Liberation Army.  This significant Tibetan diaspora, under the shared governance of the Dalai Lama’s Central Tibetan Administration and the Indian government, sought to maintain its native culture and heritage.  A foremost concern of the displaced population was the migration of the younger generations from their historic homeland.  Many feared exile implied marginalization, potentially endangering nationalism and, subsequently, future prospects of reestablishing a Tibetan government in Tibet.  To combat this growing concern, a conference was organized wherein spiritual leaders from the four schools of Tibetan Buddhism, overseen by the Dalai Lama, discussed the preservation of the culture and spiritual heritage of Tibet, as well as reviving Buddhist teachings within the exiled community in India.  The field of Tibetology was established and refers to the study of all things related to Tibet through an interdisciplinary approach utilizing facets of history, religion, language, culture, and politics.

Early growth
The Central Institute of Higher Tibetan Studies was founded in 1967 in Sarnath, India, through a joint initiative by then-Indian Prime Minister Jawaharlal Nehru and the Dalai Lama.  Its establishment came as border skirmishes at Nathu La and Cho La had reignited tensions between China and India, and the move was condemned by Beijing because it signaled further Indian support for a government it sees as hostile toward Chinese sovereignty over Tibet, in the Central Tibetan Administration.  According to the university’s website, “the objective was to take care of the cultural and educational needs of the youth among the Tibetan diaspora in India, and those of the Himalayan regions of India, who earlier had the opportunity of being educated in Tibet, this came to be discontinued in the wake of the Chinese occupation.”  The university draws-in students from Tibetan communities around the world, including from India and especially the Himalayan regions.

The government of India reviewed the institution’s progress until deciding to grant it status as an autonomous entity in 1977, while still enjoying continued “100% financial support” from India.  In 1988, the Indian government declared it a “deemed university,” officially recognizing its status as an institution for higher education.  Today, the Central Institute of Higher Tibetan Studies is considered to be one of the most premier Tibetan-based institutions of higher education and a “center of research on Tibetology, restoration of historical texts, and imparting knowledge of the four Sampradayas (schools) of Buddhism in Tibet.”  Corresponding with the context in which it was founded, the university has always been highly interconnected with Tibetan politics.  A clear example is the former head of the institute, Professor Venerable Samdhong Rinpoche, who headed the university until 2000 and later went on to assume the office of Prime Minister of the Tibetan Government in Exile.  Another example is in 2020, following renewed and intense border skirmishes between Chinese and Indian troops along the Sino-Indian border and the Indian border with the Tibet Autonomous Region, India decided to expand the teaching of Tibetology, pioneered at the now renamed Central Tibetan University, to military officers.

Formerly headed by Kyabje Zong Rinpoche, Lobsang Tenzin the Samdong Rinpoche (former Prime Minister of the Central Tibetan Administration), and Ngawang Samten, also a former alumnu. In 2016, Lobsang Norbu Shastri became the institute's leader.

The university attracts students from many regions of the Himalayas, considered as family coming from Kinnaur, Lahaul, Spiti, Ladakh, Monpas from Arunachal. Students from Nepal include Sherpas, Lamas and many more from the bordering Tibetan regions of Mustang and Dolpo. Students also come from Bhutan and Mongolia.

The university also offers courses in Tibetan medicine (Sowa Rigpa), Tibetan Astrology, and Fine Arts.

University
On 14 January 2009 the institute was officially declared as a university and the inauguration was made by the XIV Dalai Lama. Now the name of the university is Central University of Tibetan Studies.

See also
List of educational institutions in Varanasi

References

External links
 

Tibetan culture
Tibetan international schools
Tibetan Buddhist places
Universities and colleges in Varanasi
Deemed universities in Uttar Pradesh
Organisations based in Varanasi
Educational institutions established in 1967
1967 establishments in Uttar Pradesh
Buddhist universities and colleges
India–Tibet relations
Tibetan diaspora in India
Tibetan Buddhism in India